Highampton is a parish in Devon spread over approx. 4½ miles. It stands on a ridge with views of Dartmoor and Exmoor. Highampton is about 10 miles from Holsworthy, 9 miles from Okehampton and 3½ miles from Hatherleigh. The A3072 runs through Highampton.

History
Highampton was recorded in the Domesday Book in 1086. The Lord in 1086 was Roger of Meulles with Highampton valued at £3.

The Manor of Burdon
The Manor of Burdon is an Ancient Manor dating back to Anglo-Saxon times. It is thought to be one of the oldest manors in Devon. The Manor was known as Buredune at the time of William the Conqueror's Domesday Book of 1086 and was later held by Lucya de Buredone in 1241 for one-tenth of a Knight's fee. For a fuller illustrated account of the Manor, visit the Highampton Local History Group's website at www.highampton-lhg.co.uk

The current owner of the Burdon Manor house is Andrew Orchard, and the building is now used as a residential home for those with disabilities.

Buildings and Facilities
The village has a Primary School, a Post Office/ Village Shop, a Pub, a Church, and a Village Hall in which many classes e.g. dance, are run.
There is also a Local History Society.

Gallery

References

External links
 

Villages in Devon